"Muévete" is a song by Spanish singer Melody. This was the lead single from her second album Muévete and her third commercial single overall. She released it in 2002, at the age of 11.

The song debuted at number 11 in Spain for the week of 2 June 2002, peaking at number 7 one week later.

Track listing

Charts

References

External links 
 

2002 songs
2002 singles
Melody (Spanish singer) songs
Epic Records singles